Joachim Wünning (1 April 1898 – 22 September 1944) was a German politician and naval commander during the Nazi era.

In the 1932 German federal election, Wünning was elected to the Reichstag as a member of the NSDAP and represented the area of Merseburg until his death in 1944.

During World War II, Wünning served in the German navy reaching the rank of Korvettenkapitän. He was a recipient of the German Cross in Gold on 7 July 1944. Wünning was killed on 22 September 1944 near Vathi, Greece, by Allied aircraft. He was posthumously awarded the Knight's Cross of the Iron Cross on 22 October 1944.

References

Bibliography 

 
 

1898 births
1944 deaths
Recipients of the Knight's Cross of the Iron Cross
Kriegsmarine personnel killed in World War II
Members of the Reichstag of Nazi Germany
Members of the Reichstag of the Weimar Republic
Nazi Party politicians
Deaths by airstrike during World War II
People from Burgenlandkreis
Military personnel from Saxony-Anhalt